The 1952 Hawaii Rainbows football team represented the University of Hawaiʻi at Mānoa as an independent during the 1952 college football season. In their first season under head coach Hank Vasconcellos, the Rainbows compiled a 5–5–2 record.

Schedule

References

Hawaii
Hawaii Rainbow Warriors football seasons
Hawaii Rainbows football